Wakefield Kirkgate railway station is a railway station in Wakefield, West Yorkshire, England. Unlike the nearby Wakefield Westgate railway station, Kirkgate is unstaffed. The station is managed by Northern but also served by Grand Central. It is on the Hallam, Pontefract and Huddersfield lines. It has a limited number of services to London King's Cross.

History 

The original Kirkgate station opened by the Manchester and Leeds Railway in 1840 was the only station in Wakefield until Westgate was opened in 1867. The railway station building dates from 1854.

Some demolition work took place in 1972, removing buildings on the island platform and the roof with its original ironwork canopy which covered the whole station. A wall remains as evidence of these buildings. After this, Kirkgate was listed in 1979.

Since Westgate developed as Wakefield's main railway station, Kirkgate was neglected for many years and deteriorated until it was in a poor state of repair. In January 2008 the former goods warehouse was demolished to make way for a depot for Network Rail. In October 2008, part of the station wall collapsed, destroying a parked car.

The station is unstaffed and, despite the presence of CCTV, it suffered from crime. A rape, a serious assault and several robberies took place there. In July 2009, Kirkgate station was visited by Secretary of State for Transport Lord Adonis who dubbed it "the worst medium-large station in Britain". Local consensus was that the state of its facilities discouraged its use.

Refurbishment 2013–15 
Following a campaign supported by the Wakefield Express newspaper, plans to redevelop the station were formulated. In July 2011, Wakefield Council was asked to decide upon a £500,000 grant to the environmental regeneration charity Groundwork UK as part of its £4 million Kirkgate project in which new life would be breathed into the area. The proposal was approved and funds raised in March 2013.  The work was carried out in two phases between 2013 and 2015.

Work completed by June 2013 included the following items:
 Removal of life-expired and unused canopies
 Refurbishment and reglazing of the Leeds-bound canopy
 Creation of new entrances to the subway
 Installation of electronic information screens on the platforms and entrance hall

A second phase of work, completed in September 2015, included
 Units for new businesses
 Café
 Retail outlet
 Exhibition spaces
 Meeting rooms for community and local business 
 Accommodation for Groundwork Wakefield

Grand Central opened a first class lounge for its customers in April 2017.

Usage
Figures for annual passenger usage at Kirkgate have been comparatively low, with only 769 tickets sold to/from the station in the 2006/07 financial year. This is because most tickets are bought to Wakefield Stations, and it is hard to determine the true use of both Wakefield Westgate and Kirkgate, as separate entities. However, after changes in the way the statistics are split, Kirkgate's usage figure has increased dramatically to a value which more accurately reflects its true usage. Additionally over 61,000 interchanges were recorded during the same period.

Station layout 

Platform 3 – Served by north-eastbound Northern services towards Knottingley, westbound to Wakefield Westgate and Leeds and also several times each day by Grand Central eastbound towards London King's Cross (which then begin a southbound journey after ) and westbound towards Bradford Interchange via Halifax.

The island platform consisting of platforms 2 and 3, is linked to platform 1 and the station building by a newly refurbished subway, featuring better lighting and new bright white paint. Art panels were added to the subway in February 2017, and a brass band rendition of 'Jerusalem' plays in the background.

Services

Current services
Most services through this station are operated by Northern but those to London and Bradford are operated by Grand Central.

Hallam Line – There are three trains per hour to Leeds and to Sheffield, two express (one of which continues to Nottingham and the other to Lincoln) and one stopping service, with the latter running via .
Pontefract Line – There is an hourly service between Leeds and Knottingley via Pontefract Monkhill with a two-hourly service on Sundays.
Leeds to Nottingham – There is an hourly service every day in both directions, via Barnsley, Sheffield and Chesterfield.
Leeds to Lincoln - There is an hourly service every day in both directions, via Barnsley, Sheffield and Worksop.
 Bradford Interchange to London King's Cross – There are four trains in each direction per day. London trains travel via Doncaster and those to Bradford go via Mirfield and the Caldervale Line.

Summer Special trains

During the summer, excursion trains using heritage rolling stock run through the station; the Scarborough Spa Express on alternate Thursdays and The Dalesman to Carlisle running over the Settle-Carlisle line on occasional Mondays and Tuesdays. These services are hauled by diesel locomotives through West Yorkshire and changed to steam haulage part way along the routes.

See also
Listed buildings in Wakefield
Wakefield Westgate railway station

References

External links

Wakefield Express – Report about 'putrid' Wakefield Kirkgate station ignored for two years – 30 January 2009

Railway stations in Wakefield
DfT Category F1 stations
Former Great Northern Railway stations
Former Lancashire and Yorkshire Railway stations
Railway stations in Great Britain opened in 1840
Railway stations served by Grand Central Railway
Northern franchise railway stations
Grade II listed buildings in West Yorkshire
Grade II listed railway stations
Listed buildings in Wakefield